Joseph Kamwati Muchai is an Anglican bishop in Kenya: he has been Bishop of Nakuru since 2012.

References

20th-century Anglican bishops of the Anglican Church of Kenya
Anglican bishops of Nakuru
Year of birth missing (living people)
Living people